Holy Mother of God Cathedral may refer to:

 Holy Mother of God Cathedral, Harich, a church in a 7th century Armenian monastery located near the village of Harich in the Shirak Province of Armenia
 Holy Mother of God Cathedral, Nicosia, an Armenian Apostolic cathedral of the Armenian Diocese of Cyprus, located in the Strovolos district in Nicosia, Cyprus
 Holy Mother of God Cathedral, Stepanakert, a church of the Armenian Apostolic Church, located in the city of Stepanakert, Nagorno-Karabakh Republic
 Holy Mother of God Cathedral, Vagharshapat, a church located in the town of Vagharshapat, Armenia
 Holy Mother of God Cathedral, Vilnius, the episcopal see of the Orthodox Christian Metropolitan of Vilnius and all Lithuania

See also 

 Holy Mother of God Church (disambiguation)
 Monastery of Holy Mother of God (disambiguation)